George Haas III (born 23 March 1963) is an American former sport shooter who competed in the 1988 Summer Olympics.

References

1963 births
Living people
American male sport shooters
Trap and double trap shooters
Olympic shooters of the United States
Shooters at the 1988 Summer Olympics
Pan American Games medalists in shooting
Pan American Games gold medalists for the United States
Shooters at the 1987 Pan American Games